Arthur Frederick Jeffreys,  (7 April 1848 – 14 February 1906), of Burkham House in Hampshire, was a British Conservative politician.

Jeffreys was the son of Arthur Jeffreys, member of the New South Wales Legislative Council, who had emigrated to Australia in 1839. During his youth he was a successful cricketer with Hampshire and New South Wales.

He graduated from Christ Church, Oxford with a B.A. He studied law at the Inner Temple and was called to the bar in 1872.  He served as a justice of the peace for Hampshire.

He was elected to the House of Commons for Basingstoke in 1887, a seat he held until his death. He was sworn a member of the Imperial Privy Council on 11 August 1902, following an announcement of the King's intention to make this appointment in the 1902 Coronation Honours list published in June that year. He served briefly under Arthur Balfour as Parliamentary Secretary to the Local Government Board from June to December 1905.

Jeffreys died in February 1906, aged 57. In 1877 he married Amy Fenwick, and their son George became a prominent military commander and was elevated to the peerage as Baron Jeffreys in 1952.

References

Reference

Kidd, Charles, Williamson, David (editors). Debrett's Peerage and Baronetage (1990 edition). New York: St Martin's Press, 1990.

Parliament of New South Wales - Information on father

External links 

Parliamentary Archives, Diary of Rt. Hon. Arthur Frederick Jeffreys MP

1848 births
1906 deaths
Members of the Privy Council of the United Kingdom
Conservative Party (UK) MPs for English constituencies
UK MPs 1886–1892
UK MPs 1892–1895
UK MPs 1895–1900
UK MPs 1900–1906
English cricketers
Marylebone Cricket Club cricketers
Hampshire cricketers
New South Wales cricketers
British sportsperson-politicians